Mathias Franzén (born 20 June 1992) is a Swedish professional ice hockey player, currently playing with Almtuna IS in the HockeyAllsvenskan. He played with AIK IF in the Elitserien (SEL) during the 2010–11 Elitserien season.

References

External links

1992 births
Almtuna IS players
AIK IF players
Living people
Swedish ice hockey forwards